Naso brachycentron, commonly known as the humpback unicornfish, is a species of unicornfish commonly found in tropical reefs, so named because of its distinctive humped back. Its habitat includes most of the coastline of the Indonesian islands and some areas off the coast of Africa.

References

External links
 

Naso (fish)
Fish described in 1835